The 1835 Connecticut gubernatorial election was held on April 6, 1835. It was a rematch of the 1834 Connecticut gubernatorial election. Former governor, senator and Democratic nominee Henry W. Edwards was elected, defeating incumbent governor and Whig nominee Samuel A. Foot with 52.13% of the vote.

This was the last appearance of the Anti-Masonic Party in a Connecticut gubernatorial election.

General election

Candidates
Major party candidates

Henry W. Edwards, Democratic
Samuel A. Foot, Whig

Candidates
Minor party candidates

Zalmon Storrs, Anti-Masonic

Results

References

1835
Connecticut
Gubernatorial